Josefin Anna Louise Olsson (born 23 August 1989 in Nyköping) is a Swedish sports sailor.

At the 2012 Summer Olympics, she competed in the Women's Laser Radial class, finishing in 18th place. She competed in the same event at the 2016 Olympics, finishing in 6th place. She competed at the 2020 Summer Olympics in Tokyo 2021, competing in Laser Radial.

Achievements

References

External links
 
 
 
 

1989 births
Living people
Swedish female sailors (sport)
Olympic sailors of Sweden
Olympic silver medalists for Sweden
Olympic medalists in sailing
Sailors at the 2012 Summer Olympics – Laser Radial
Sailors at the 2016 Summer Olympics – Laser Radial
Sailors at the 2020 Summer Olympics – Laser Radial
Medalists at the 2020 Summer Olympics
Europe class world champions
World champions in sailing for Sweden
People from Nyköping Municipality
Sportspeople from Södermanland County